The canton of Neuves-Maisons is an administrative division of the Meurthe-et-Moselle department, northeastern France. Its borders were modified at the French canton reorganisation which came into effect in March 2015. Its seat is in Neuves-Maisons.

It consists of the following communes:

Bainville-sur-Madon
Chaligny
Chavigny
Flavigny-sur-Moselle
Frolois
Maizières
Maron
Méréville
Messein
Neuves-Maisons
Pont-Saint-Vincent
Pulligny
Richardménil
Sexey-aux-Forges

References

Cantons of Meurthe-et-Moselle